Soheyl Najafabad (also Romanized as Soheyl Najafābād; also known as Najafābād, Qeshlāq-e Soheyl, Qeshlāq-e Soheyl Najafābād, and Soheyl) is a village in Rudshur Rural District, in the Central District of Zarandieh County, Markazi Province, Iran. At the 2006 census, its population was 34, in 8 families.

References 

Populated places in Zarandieh County